The Asafo flags are regimental flags of the Fante people, an ethnic group that mainly resides in Ghana's central coastal region. The flags are influenced by a combination of Akan proverbs, visual imagery, and European heraldic tradition.

History 

The Fante people live in the coastal areas of Ghana in fishing communities such as Anomabu, Saltpond, Mankessim, and Elmina, Ghana in the town of Cape Coast. Historically, they have been concerned with fighting the Ashantis, a part of the Akan ethnic group native to the Ashanti Region of modern-day Ghana, due to the Ashantis demanding tribute from them. The conflict manifested in interstate rivalries as a result of the dispersed nature of power. The Asafo companies were developed to defend the state as a military group of men in Fante villages. In the local language, Asafo is derived from the words sa meaning 'war', and fo meaning 'people'.

Asafo companies were responsible for sanitation and roadworks, protection of state goods, local policies, conducting funeral rights, and community entertainment. After trading gold, ivory, and slaves with the Europeans, the Asafo companies adapted their flags in order to display designs symbolizing proverbs about security and warfare. The fighting duties of the Asafo companies ended with British colonialization, but they still have their role in the ritual life of Fante villages.

Asafo flags 

In Fante, flags are called frank, and they are a key item of Asafo regalia. A man who wishes to join Asafo society designs a new flag and commissions its production from the local flag maker. The imagery of the flag challenges rival groups as it asserts the wealth and power of the company. The designs are a reflection of the importance of proverbs throughout the Akan culture. A company's flags are usually hung around the Posuban, a concrete shrine for each company that is colourfully decorated with bright figures and serves as a place for regalia and sacrifice. The flags are carried on a procession through the village, and are used at annual festivals, funerals for company members, and other occasions.

Examples

Significance 
Asafo flags are still being made and used as an important part of communal life in Fante villages. The flags have been highly collectible in countries and regions outside Ghana since the 1990s for their striking imagery.

References 

History of Ghana